The 1998 Major League Soccer All-Star Game was the 3rd Major League Soccer All-Star Game, played on August 2, 1998, at the Citrus Bowl in Orlando, Florida. A team of United States all-stars, MLS USA, beat a team of International MLS all-stars, MLS World, by a score of 6–1.

The 1998 MLS All-Star Game was preceded by a Women's international friendly match between the United States and Canada.

Venue

Match details 

|valign="top"|
|valign="top" style="width:50%"|

References

External links
MLS All-Star Game 1998 match report

MLS All-Star Game
All-Star Game
MLS All-Star
August 1998 sports events in the United States
Sports competitions in Orlando, Florida
1990s in Orlando, Florida